Ivan Pongračić (born 8 March 1980) is a Croatian handball player and former Croatian national team.

Honours
Zagreb
Croatian First League
Winner (2): 2004-05, 2005-06
Croatian Cup
Winner (2): 2005, 2006
EHF Cup Winners' Cup
Finalist (1): 2005

Osijek Elektromodul
Croatian First League
Runner up (1): 2006-07

Kolubara
Serbian Super League
Winner (1): 2009-10
Serbian Cup
Winner (1): 2010

References

External links
European competition
Rukomestat

1980 births
Living people
Sportspeople from Đakovo
Croatian male handball players
RK Zamet players
RK Zagreb players
Croatian expatriate sportspeople in Serbia
Croatian expatriate sportspeople in Norway
Mediterranean Games silver medalists for Croatia
Competitors at the 2005 Mediterranean Games
Mediterranean Games medalists in handball